British forces in the Falklands War can be:
British naval forces in the Falklands War
British ground forces in the Falklands War
British air services in the Falklands War